Rat Race is the debut studio album by hard rock/heavy metal band Child'ƨ Play, released in 1990 through Chrysalis Records. It was produced by Howard Benson, who would later go on to produce for Motörhead, Sepultura, and Seether. It is the first album to feature new bassist Marion Idzi, going by the mononym Idzi. It is also the first album to feature Brian Jack on lead vocals, as previous vocalist Lawrence Hinshaw left the band in 1988, who only appeared on the band's 1986 EP, Ruff House. The band released three singles from the album, the title track which was the only song to have an MTV music video, "Wind", and "Capricorn/Bang Bang".

Critical reception

Richard Egan at AllMusic gave Rat Race four and a half stars out of five. The album was a regional success in the band's hometown of Baltimore, Maryland, and they toured nationally opening for the band, Cold Sweat. However the album was unable to make national sales and as a result, Brian Jack left the band in 1991 to pursue a solo career.

Track listing

Personnel

Child'ƨ Play
Brian Jack - lead vocals, guitars
Nicky Kay - guitars, backing vocals
Idzi - bass, backing vocals
John Allen - drums, backing vocals, lead vocals on "Evicted" and "Pay Your Dues", co-lead vocals on "Rat Race"

Production
Howard Benson – producers, engineers, mixing

References

External links
 Official Site (archive)

1990 debut albums
Child's Play (band) albums
Chrysalis Records albums
Albums produced by Howard Benson